Farewell, My Beautiful Naples (Italian: Addio, mia bella Napoli!) is a 1946 Italian musical melodrama film directed by Mario Bonnard and starring Fosco Giachetti, Vera Carmi and Clelia Matania. It is based on a 1910 play which had previously been made into a 1917 silent film of the same title. Location shooting took place around Naples, including at Pompeii, Amalfi and Capri.

Synopsis
In Naples, a local composer falls in love with an American tourist.

Cast
 Fosco Giachetti as Carlo Sanna, composer
 Vera Carmi as Roberta Sullivan 
 Clelia Matania as Yvonne de Fleurette 
 Paolo Stoppa as Ruocco 
 Bella Starace Sainati
 Lidia Drutskoy
 Franco Pesce

References

Bibliography
 Brunetta, Gian Piero. The History of Italian Cinema: A Guide to Italian Film from Its Origins to the Twenty-first Century.  Princeton University Press, 2009.

External links

1946 films
1940s Italian-language films
1946 drama films
Italian drama films
Italian black-and-white films
Films directed by Mario Bonnard
Films set in Naples
Films shot in Naples
Melodrama films
1940s Italian films